František Laudát (born 13 March 1960) is a Czech politician, who served as a Member of the Chamber of Deputies (MP) from 2013 until 2017. He previously served as an MP from 2006 to 2013. He has been a member of TOP 09 since 2009. From 1991-2009 he was a member of the Civic Democratic Party.

References

External links
Profile on the website of TOP 09
Profile on the website of Chamber of Deputies of the Parliament of the Czech republic

1960 births
Living people
TOP 09 MPs
Civic Democratic Party (Czech Republic) politicians
People from Ledeč nad Sázavou
Czech Technical University in Prague alumni
Members of the Chamber of Deputies of the Czech Republic (2006–2010)
Members of the Chamber of Deputies of the Czech Republic (2010–2013)
Members of the Chamber of Deputies of the Czech Republic (2013–2017)